Matthew John Parsons (born 25 December 1991) is an English footballer who plays as a left back for Faversham Town.

Early life
Parsons attended Sedgehill School, Lewisham.

Playing career
Parsons graduated from the Crystal Palace Academy to sign his first professional contract with Crystal Palace in April 2010. He made his first team debut in the League Cup Second Round on 24 August 2010, replacing Edgar Davids 82 minutes into their 1–1 draw with Portsmouth at Fratton Park, his team losing 4–3 on penalties. He made his first league appearance the following January, playing the full game and impressing fans in a goalless draw with Norwich City at Selhurst Park.

He joined Barnet on loan in March 2011.

In the 2011–12 season Parsons went on to play six times in all competitions for Crystal Palace.

On 30 August 2012, he joined Wycombe Wanderers on loan for an initial one month youth loan deal.

On 17 January 2014, Parsons joined Plymouth Argyle for an undisclosed fee until the end of the 2013–14 season.

References

External links

Living people
1991 births
English footballers
Association football fullbacks
Crystal Palace F.C. players
Barnet F.C. players
Eastbourne Borough F.C. players
Wycombe Wanderers F.C. players
Plymouth Argyle F.C. players
Boreham Wood F.C. players
Leatherhead F.C. players
Chatham Town F.C. players
Maidenhead United F.C. players
Greenwich Borough F.C. players
Erith & Belvedere F.C. players
Cray Valley Paper Mills F.C. players
Cray Wanderers F.C. players
Faversham Town F.C. players
Corinthian-Casuals F.C. players
Romford F.C. players
Glebe F.C. players
Sheppey United F.C. players
English Football League players
National League (English football) players
Isthmian League players